Stephania (minor planet designation: 220 Stephania) is a dark background asteroid from the inner regions of the asteroid belt, approximately  in diameter. It was discovered on 19 May 1881, by Austrian astronomer Johann Palisa at the Vienna Observatory. The C-type asteroid has a rotation period of 18.2 hours. It was named after Princess Stéphanie of Belgium.

Classification and orbit 

Stephania is a non-family asteroid of the main belt's background population, when applying the Hierarchical Clustering Method to its proper orbital elements. It orbits the Sun in the inner asteroid belt at a distance of 1.7–3.0 AU once every 3 years and 7 months (1,315 days). Its orbit has an eccentricity of 0.26 and an inclination of 8° with respect to the ecliptic.

Discovery and naming 

Stephania was discovered by Johann Palisa on May 19, 1881, in Vienna. It was the first discovery he made after transferring to the observatory from Pola.

The name honours Crown Princess Stéphanie (1864–1945), wife of the heir-apparent Crown Prince Rudolf of Austria. The couple was married the year the asteroid was discovered. It was the first time that a naming commemorated a wedding and was given as a wedding gift. The official naming citation was mentioned in The Names of the Minor Planets by Paul Herget in 1955.

Physical characteristics

Spectral type 

In the Tholen classification, this asteroid's spectrum is ambiguous, close to an X-type and somewhat similar to that of a carbonaceous C-type asteroid (CX). A French spectroscopic survey that observed two dozens of these X-types classified by Tholen, determined that Stephania is in fact a carbonaceous C-type asteroid (rather than an X-type). The Wide-field Infrared Survey Explorer (WISE) has also characterized it as a primitive P-type asteroid.

Lightcurves 

Lightcurve data has also been recorded by observers at the Antelope Hill Observatory, which has been designated as an official observatory by the Minor Planet Center.

Diameter and albedo 

According to the surveys carried out by the Infrared Astronomical Satellite IRAS, the Japanese Akari satellite and the NEOWISE mission of NASA's WISE telescope, Stephania measures between 31.12 and 38.46 kilometers in diameter and its surface has a low albedo between 0.03 and 0.075. The Collaborative Asteroid Lightcurve Link derives an albedo of 0.0607 and a diameter of 31.04 kilometers based on an absolute magnitude of 11.2.

Notes

References

External links 
 Asteroid Lightcurve Database (LCDB), query form (info )
 Dictionary of Minor Planet Names, Google books
 Asteroids and comets rotation curves, CdR – Observatoire de Genève, Raoul Behrend
 Lightcurves from the Antelope Hills Observatory
 Discovery Circumstances: Numbered Minor Planets (1)-(5000) – Minor Planet Center
 
 

000220
Discoveries by Johann Palisa
Named minor planets
000220
18810519